Tromode is a village in Braddan parish, Isle of Man. It is on the boundary with and partly within the borough of Douglas, and is within the Douglas conurbation.

During the period of Manx nationalism, Ny Troor Tromode ("The Tromode Three") committed acts of arson and vandalism on the island.

Notable residents
 Archibald Knox (1864-1933), pioneer of Manx art nouveau

References

Villages in the Isle of Man